In association football, or soccer, a goalkeeper's primary role is to prevent the opposing team from scoring (moving the ball over the defended goal-line within the frame of the goal). This is accomplished by the goalkeeper moving into the path of the ball and either catching it or directing it away from the vicinity of the goal line. Within the penalty area goalkeepers are able to use their hands, making them (outside throw-ins) the only players on the field permitted to handle the ball.

The process of preventing a ball from crossing the line is known as a save.  In  National Collegiate Athletic Association (NCAA) Division I soccer, where a player's career is at most four seasons long, it is considered a notable achievement to reach the 450-save threshold. In even rarer instances, players have reached the 500 and 600-save plateaus. The top 30 highest career saves leaders in NCAA Division I men's soccer history are listed below. The NCAA did not split into its current divisions format until August 1973. From 1959 to 1971, there were no classifications to the NCAA nor its predecessor, the Intercollegiate Soccer Football Association (ISFA). Then, from 1972 to 1973, colleges were classified as either "NCAA University Division (Major College)" or "NCAA College Division (Small College)".

Below is a list of the top career saves leaders in NCAA Division I men's soccer history.

Career leaders

References

External links 
 NCAA Division I Men's Soccer Record Book

NCAA Division I men's soccer statistical leaders